The Solomon Sea Plate is a minor tectonic plate to the northwest of the Solomon Islands archipelago in the south Pacific Ocean. Itt roughly corresponds with the Solomon Sea east of Papua New Guinea.

Tectonics
The tectonic regime in this part of the world is extremely complex and involves a number of minor as well as major plates. The Solomon Sea Plate is an oceanic crustal plate remnant which is disappearing into two subduction zones, one to its north, the other on its southwest margin. Its southeast margin runs along the Woodlark Rise, an undefined compressive zone which may be a transform fault marking the boundary with the adjoining Woodlark Plate.

The northern subduction zone is located where the Solomon Plate is diving below the South Bismarck Plate to the northwest and the Pacific Plate to the northeast.  The northwest part of the subduction zone is called the New Britain Subduction Zone.  New Britain in Papua New Guinea is the volcanic island formed from this collision and resulting volcanism. The southwestern subduction zone is where the Solomon Plate is diving below the Indo-Australian Plate.

See also
List of earthquakes in Papua New Guinea

References

External links
 Preliminary Analysis of the April 2007 Solomon Islands Tsunami, Southwest Pacific Ocean, USGS
 Report on interplate propagation of subduction stress rupture, Solomon earthquake of 2007

Tectonic plates
Geology of the Pacific Ocean